Chuye Dile Mon is a 2015 Bangladeshi romantic film, produced by Asiatic Ddhoni-Chitra Limited & Monforing Limited. The film is directed by Shihab Shaheen and features a cast that includes Arifin Shuvoo and Zakia Bari Momo in lead roles while Iresh Zaker and Misha Sawdagor play pivotal supporting role.

Chuye Dile Mon is a childhood love story which takes place in Hridoypur and how two lovers go apart as they grow up. Chuye Dile Mon is released in Bangladesh on 10 April 2015 as the producers planned to release the film overseas later. It was later announced that the film will be releasing in North America on 9 May 2015.

Synopsis
The story of two lovers grew close and then divided apart by the society. Abir Hasan (Arifin Shuvo) and Nila Khan (Zakia Bari Momo) loves each other. Growing up in a conservative family, Nila hesitates to express her feelings to parents while Abir's family is very moderate. Abir decides to talk to Nila's father about their relationship and want to marry Nila. However, Nila's father reacts angrily and decides to manipulate Abir and later humiliates them and forces Abir's family to leave the county. Abir settles in Dhaka. Years Later, Still in madly love with Nila, Abir comes back to Hridoypur to regain the respect and win back Nila from her family.

Cast
 Arifin Shuvoo as Abir Hasan
 Zakia Bari Momo as Nila Khan
 Iresh Zaker as Danny
 Misha Sawdagor as Abir's brother-in-law
 Sushoma Sarkar as Abir's sister
 Ali Raj as Afzal Khan, Nila's father
 Mahamudul Islam Mithu as Ashfaq Khan, Nila's uncle and Danny's father
 Khaledur Rahman Khan Anando as Pavel, Abir's friend
 Quazi Nawshaba Ahmed as Abonti, Special Appearance 
 Khalequzzaman 
 Sabiha Zaman
 Kazi Uzzal
 Airin Adhikari
 Danger Zahid
 Mezbah Uddin Sumon

Production

Marketing
The first soundtrack of Chuye Dile Mon was released on market on 1 November 2014. Second Track was released on 17 November 2014. The tracks of the films were sung by Tahsan Rahman Khan and Habib Wahid. On 1 November 2014, Pepsi and Ekhanei.com joined the film as sponsor and marketing partner alongside Microsoft and Unilever Bangladesh. Radio Foorti has since been the radio partner for film's soundtrack and radio promotions. Director Shihab Shaheen has confirmed that the film is slated to release on 10 April 2015.

Development
Asiatic Ddhoni-Chitra Limited was supposed to distribute the film on 29 January 2015 in Bangladesh, However, due to Cricket World Cup inauguration on the same date, the release date was pushed back to 10 April 2015. Distributors have expressed their plan to release the film overseas. On 1 January 2015, Chuye Dile Mon received uncut release certificate from the censor board.

Filming
Filming of Chuye Dile Mon began in Chhatak during early 2014. A Portion of the film was shot on Dhaka until the climax scene, which was shot is Chhatak. The scenes of the film was shot in the rural part of the country to give the film a fresh, greenery look.

Release
Chuye Dile Mon was released on 43 screens around Bangladesh on 10 April 2015. Although the film has a potential to be released in much wider market, the producers have expressed their intention to release the film in few selected screens for the first week to eliminate the risk of piracy. The film was released on the biggest theaters in the country including Bashundhara Cineplex, Blockbuster Cinema, Balaka Cineworld and Shyamoli Cinema. According to sources, the film's screening will be boosted to over 100 theaters by second week. 
Upon release, director Shihab Shaheen and Arifin Shuvoo confirmed that the film will be released in North America, UK, and Australia during late 2015. The film was released in United States on 9 May 2015 and in Australia on 26 May 2015.

Soundtrack
Soundtrack Album for Chuye Dile Mon consists of 5 tracks, composed by Sajid Sarkar & Habib Wahid [Bhalobasha Dao]. The title track was sung by Tahsan Rahman Khan and second track titled Bhalobasha Dao was sung by Habib Wahid. The full album was released on 28 November 2014 by Girona Music. Title Track, Chuye Dile Mon's video clip was released on 30 December 2014

Soundtrack reception
The title track Chuye Dile Mon was released on 30 December 2014. The track was well received by the audiences and critics. The track received over 1 million hits on YouTube. The second track of the film Shunno Theke was released on 16 March 2015. The track, influenced by the music of Chittagong Hill Tracts, received very favorable response. The track received over 400,000 hits on YouTube within month of its release. The complete music album was favored well by both critics and audiences as one of the best film soundtrack album in recent years.

See also
 List of Bangladeshi films of 2015

References

2015 films
2015 romantic comedy-drama films
Bengali-language Bangladeshi films
Bangladeshi romantic comedy-drama films
Films scored by Habib Wahid
Films scored by Sajid Sarkar
2010s Bengali-language films
2015 directorial debut films
Best Film Meril-Prothom Alo Critics Award winners